The Assault is a 2017 action film directed by Jacob Cooney and starring Tom Sizemore, Jordan Ladd, Nikki Moore, Kevin Nash, and David Gere.

Plot
A woman (Jordan Ladd) dissatisfied with her marriage arranges robberies to escape her abusive husband with her best friend (Nikki Moore), but when the dead escapes, Detective Gary Broza (Tom Sizemore) sets out on their trail.

Cast
Tom Sizemore as Gary Broza
Jordan Ladd as Lindsay Walters
Nikki Moore as Nicole
Tom Denucci as Seth Walters
Kevin Nash as Cisco
David Gere as Declan

Production 
Filming for The Assault took place in Cromwell and Middletown, Connecticut, under the working title of Blue Line. Principal photography was completed in February 2015.

Release
The film was released in to DVD in July 2017.

Reception 
Nerdly was critical, writing that "I do commend Cooney for wanting to make a film that has two strong female leads, it’s just that the finished product doesn’t portray them as such. In fact it’s not until the concluding moments of The Assault that our two leads actually get the least bit interesting… but by then its too little too late unfortunately."

References

External links

                

2017 films
American action films
2017 action films
2017 independent films
2010s American films